Dunbabin is a surname. Notable people with the surname include:

 Thomas Dunbabin (1911–1955), Australian classicist scholar and archaeologist of Tasmanian origin. 
 William Dunbabin (1894–1975), Australian politician.
 Jean Dunbabin, honorary fellow of St Anne's College, University of Oxford.

See also
 Dunbabin Point, small peninsula which lies near Daltons beach, in the south east of Tasmania.